SAGE (Strategy Action Game Engine) is a game engine used primarily for real-time strategy games developed by Westwood Studios and Electronic Arts. Earlier implementations of the engine were known as W3D (Westwood 3D) while later versions were branded SAGE 2.0.

History
The first version of the engine, originally named W3D, was a major modification of the SurRender 3D engine developed by Hybrid Graphics Ltd. Westwood first used W3D for their first-person shooter Command & Conquer: Renegade and their massively multiplayer online role-playing game Earth & Beyond.

After Westwood was dissolved by their parent company, Electronic Arts, the engine was renamed SAGE (Strategy Action Game Engine) and updated for the release of Command & Conquer: Generals. The rendering portion remained nearly identical to the W3D engine, but most other elements had been redesigned from the ground up. The updated SAGE engine allowed for dynamic lighting that would cast realistic shadows and reflections on most objects, as well as higher quality visual effects and a stop-motion camera feature. The SAGE engine would continue to be used by EA Los Angeles on additional titles in the Command & Conquer series and on the real-time strategy series The Lord of the Rings: The Battle for Middle-earth.

Following the release of the Command & Conquer 3 expansion Kane's Wrath, the engine underwent a large overhaul of its major systems. This new version of the engine was called SAGE 2.0 and was first used on Command & Conquer: Red Alert 3. Major upgrades included support for the PlayStation 3, an upgrade of the renderer to RNA (RenderWare New Architecture), complete replacement of the math library with RenderWare Math, integration of RenderWare Physics, dynamic environmental music, and numerous minor internal improvements. A common misconception was that the new engine itself was called RNA when in fact RNA only referred to the renderer. The last title to use the SAGE 2.0 engine was Command & Conquer 4: Tiberian Twilight.

Games

W3D engine
Earth & Beyond
Emperor: Battle for Dune
Command & Conquer: Renegade
Command & Conquer: Tiberian Incursion (canceled)
Command & Conquer: Renegade 2 (canceled)
Command & Conquer: Continuum (canceled)

SAGE engine
Command & Conquer: Generals
Command & Conquer: Generals – Zero Hour
The Lord of the Rings: The Battle for Middle-earth
The Lord of the Rings: The Battle for Middle-earth II
The Lord of the Rings: The Battle for Middle-earth II: The Rise of the Witch-king
Command & Conquer 3: Tiberium Wars
Command & Conquer 3: Kane's Wrath

SAGE 2.0 engine
Command & Conquer: Red Alert 3
Command & Conquer: Red Alert 3 – Uprising
Command & Conquer 4: Tiberian Twilight

References

2001 software
SAGE (game engine) games
Video game engines
Westwood Studios